John Mark, a character in the Bible.

John Mark may also refer to:

John Martin Mark, MP in the Northern Ireland parliament for Londonderry
John Mark (athlete), lit the Olympic flame at the 1948 Summer Olympics

See also
John Marks (disambiguation)